Nemanja Maksimović (born 26 January 1995) is a Serbian professional footballer who plays as a defensive midfielder for La Liga club Getafe and the Serbian national team.

Club career

Early career
Born in Banja Koviljača, Maksimović played for Red Star Belgrade's youth selection teams up until the under-19 level, but eventually had his contract terminated. After his display at the 2013 UEFA U19 Championship, he signed with Slovenian side Domžale. He made his professional debut on 18 October 2013 in a 2–2 draw with Zavrč.

Astana
On 7 February 2015, Maksimović signed a two-and-a-half-year contract with Astana of the Kazakhstan Premier League. On 27 August 2015, Maksimović scored the equalizing goal against APOEL in the second leg of the 2015–16 UEFA Champions League play-offs, which qualified Astana to their first ever Champions League group stage campaign.

Valencia
On 2 July 2017, Valencia announced the signing of Maksimović on a contract until 2022. He made his debut for the club on 18 August, coming on as a late substitute for Carlos Soler in a 1–0 La Liga home win against Las Palmas.

Getafe
On 16 July 2018, Maksimović signed with Getafe until 2024.

International career
Maksimović played for the Serbia U19 team that won the 2013 UEFA European Under-19 Championship. He was named to Serbia's U20 squad for the 2015 FIFA U-20 World Cup in New Zealand, scoring the winner with two minutes of extra-time remaining in the final, beating Brazil 2–1 for Serbia's first international honour as an independent nation.
Maksimović made his debut for Serbia on 23 March 2016, in a 1–0 defeat to Poland. In May 2018 he was named in Serbia’s preliminary squad for the 2018 FIFA World Cup in Russia, but he wasn't selected for the final squad.

In November 2022, he was selected in Serbia's squad for the 2022 FIFA World Cup in Qatar. He played in all three group stage matches, against Brazil, Cameroon, and Switzerland. Serbia finished fourth in the group.

Career statistics

Club

International

Honours
Astana
Kazakhstan Premier League: 2015, 2016
Kazakhstan Cup: 2016
Kazakhstan Super Cup: 2015

Serbia
UEFA European U-19 Championship: 2013
FIFA U-20 World Cup: 2015

Orders
Medal of Merit (Republika Srpska)

References

External links
 
 NZS profile 

1995 births
Living people
People from Banja Koviljača
Sportspeople from Loznica
Serbian footballers
Serbia youth international footballers
Serbia under-21 international footballers
Association football midfielders
Serbian expatriate footballers
Expatriate footballers in Italy
Expatriate footballers in Slovenia
Expatriate footballers in Kazakhstan
Expatriate footballers in Spain
Slovenian PrvaLiga players
Kazakhstan Premier League players
Serbian expatriate sportspeople in Italy
Serbian expatriate sportspeople in Slovenia
Serbian expatriate sportspeople in Spain
NK Domžale players
FC Astana players
La Liga players
Valencia CF players
Getafe CF footballers
Serbia international footballers
2022 FIFA World Cup players